San Vitaliano is a comune (municipality) in the Metropolitan City of Naples in the Italian region Campania, located about 25 km northeast of Naples.

San Vitaliano borders the following municipalities: Marigliano, Nola, Saviano, Scisciano.

References

Cities and towns in Campania